Kona Skatepark is a skateboard park in Jacksonville, Florida. It was opened in 1977, making it the second oldest operating skatepark in the world, surpassed only by Derby Skatepark in Santa Cruz which opened one year prior in 1976.

It was built during the 1970s skateboarding boom, when many other cities opened their first skateparks. While other parks opened during the 1970s later shut down, Kona Skatepark stayed open.

The park originally included a beginner area, a bowl, and some cruising features, such as speed runs, and banked curves. Today more features have been added, though some people say it is also in need of repairs. In 2017, the park had an event to celebrate the 40 year anniversary of its opening.

References

Parks in Jacksonville, Florida
1977 establishments in Florida